"Open Your Arms" is a 1988 single by Scottish alternative rock group Goodbye Mr Mackenzie. It was their second major label single recorded for EMI's Capitol Records.

"Open Your Arms" later featured on the band's debut album Good Deeds and Dirty Rags which was released the following year. In 1991, after Goodbye Mr Mackenzie had signed to Gary Kurfirst's Radioactive Records, "Open Your Arms" was remixed and featured on their debut international album release, the self-titled Goodbye Mr. Mackenzie.

Track listings

UK 7" single Capitol Records CL 513
UK 7" single Capitol Records CLG 513 (Gatefold sleeve)

"Open Your Arms" - 3:37	
"Secrets" - 3:44

UK 12" single Capitol Records 12CL 513
UK 12" single Capitol Records 12CLP 513 (Picture disc)

"Open Your Arms" - 3:37	
"Secrets" - 3:44		
"Amsterdam" - 3:25 (Jaques Brel/Mort Shuman)

UK 12" single Capitol Records 12CLG 513 (Gatefold sleeve)
"Open Your Arms" - 7:21	
"Secrets" - 3:44		
"Amsterdam" - 3:25 (Jaques Brel/Mort Shuman)
"Pleasure Search" - 3:32

UK CD single Capitol Records CDCL 513

"Open Your Arms" - 3:37	
"Secrets" - 3:44		
"Amsterdam" - 3:25 (Jaques Brel/Mort Shuman)
"Pleasure Search" - 3:32

Charts

References

External links
Goodbye Mr Mackenzie website
"Open Your Arms" music video at YouTube
"Open Your Arms" discography

1988 singles
1988 songs
Goodbye Mr Mackenzie songs
Capitol Records singles